Helen Ferrers (1869–1943), born Helen Finney, was a British stage and film actress.

Personal life
Helen Finney was born in Cookham in Berkshire, the daughter of a London coal merchant and the younger sister of the actress May Fortescue ( Emily May Finney). 

She was married to the actor Eugène François Mayeur, who died in 1918. The couple had one daughter, Mary Helen Mayeur.

Filmography

Selected stage credits
 The Cardinal (1903, Louis N. Parker)
 The River (1925, Patrick Hastings)

References

External links
 

1869 births
1943 deaths
English film actresses
People from Cookham
20th-century English actresses